Scott Hardy is an Australian former professional rugby league footballer who played in the 1990s. He played for Western Suburbs in the NSWRL competition.

Playing career
Hardy made his first grade debut for Western Suburbs in round 20 of the 1992 NSWRL season against Canterbury-Bankstown. Hardy scored a try as Western Suburbs won the game 28-16 at Campbelltown Sports Stadium. Hardy played three seasons for Western Suburbs in the NSWRL with his last game also coming against Canterbury which ended in a 40-12 loss. In 2021, a news article reported that Hardy was still playing active rugby league at the age of 50 in the local A-Grade competition.

References

1970 births
Western Suburbs Magpies players
Australian rugby league players
Rugby league second-rows
Living people